John Burke Barry (January 27, 1880 – January 10, 1937) was an American equestrian. He competed at the 1920 Summer Olympics and the 1924 Summer Olympics. 

Along with fellow Olympic rider Sloan Doak, Barry designed the show jumping course for the 1932 Summer Olympics. The course was "brutally difficult" and resulted in the elimination of six of the 11 riders.

References

External links
 

1880 births
1937 deaths
American male equestrians
Olympic equestrians of the United States
Equestrians at the 1920 Summer Olympics
Equestrians at the 1924 Summer Olympics
People from Cherokee County, Texas